Amarildo de Jesus Santos (born July 6, 1986), known as just Amarildo, is a Brazilian football player.

Club statistics

References

External links

1986 births
Living people
Brazilian footballers
J2 League players
Shonan Bellmare players
Brazilian expatriate footballers
Expatriate footballers in Japan
Association football defenders